The Punjagutta Metro Station is located on the Red Line of the Hyderabad Metro. It is part of Corridor I of the Hyderabad Metro starting from Miyapur and was opened to the public on 24 September 2018.

History 
It was opened to the public on 24 September 2018. In October 2022, Punjagutta metro station was awarded Indian Green Building Council (IGBC) Green MRTS Certification with the highest platinum rating under elevated stations category.

Facilities 
A skywalk and public space has been constructed between Metro mall (Hyderabad Next Galleria) at Panjagutta and the Metro station. The Metro Rail viaduct at Punjagutta was built in four months by Larsen & Toubro Hyderabad Metro Rail.

References

Hyderabad Metro stations